The 2017 FIU Panthers football team represented Florida International University in the 2017 NCAA Division I FBS football season. The Panthers played their home games at the Riccardo Silva Stadium in Miami, Florida as members of the East Division of Conference USA (C–USA). They were led by first-year head coach Butch Davis. The Panthers finished the season 8–5, 5–3 in C-USA play to finish in second place in the East Division. They received an invitation to the Gasparilla Bowl where they lost to Temple.

Previous season 
The Panther finished the 2016 season 4–8, 4–4 in C-USA play to finish in fourth place in the East Division. The highlight of the season was beating rival Florida Atlantic in the Shula Bowl on October 1.

Following the season, the school fired Ron Turner after four years at FIU. On November 15, the school hired Butch Davis as head coach.

Spring Game
The 2017 Spring Game took place in University Park on April 7, at 7:00 PM.

Offseason 
Following the conclusion of the 2016 season, several Panthers were invited to participate in postseason all-star games. Invitations include: Trey Hendrickson (DE) participating in the East–West Shrine Game on January 21, 2017, Imarjaye Albury (DT) participating in the NFLPA Collegiate Bowl on January 21, 2017 and Michael Montero (OL) participating in the Tropical Bowl on January 15, 2017.

Departures
Notable departures from the 2016 squad included:

2017 NFL Draft

Panthers who were picked in the 2017 NFL Draft:

Schedule
FIU announced its 2017 football schedule on January 26, 2017. The 2017 schedule consisted of six home and away games in the regular season. 

The game between Alcorn State and FIU was relocated to Legion Field at Birmingham, Alabama due to Hurricane Irma.
 A game with UMass was scheduled after the game between UMass and South Florida was postponed due to Hurricane Irma, and FIU's game with Indiana was canceled.
Schedule Source:

Game summaries

at UCF

Alcorn State

at Rice

Charlotte

at Middle Tennessee

Tulane

at Marshall

UTSA

Old Dominion

at Florida Atlantic

WKU

UMass

Temple–Gasparilla Bowl

References

FIU
FIU Panthers football seasons
FIU Panthers football